Kani Gowhar (also Romanized as Kānī Gowhar and Kanī Gowhar) is a village in Palanganeh Rural District, in the Central District of Javanrud County, Kermanshah Province, Iran. At the 2006 census, its population was 140, in 28 families.

References 

Populated places in Javanrud County